Martin Beneke (born 1966) is a German physicist.

Biography
Beneke studied Physics, Mathematics and Philosophy at the University of Konstanz, University of Cambridge and University of Heidelberg. In 1993 he received his doctorate at the Technical University of Munich on the structure of perturbative series in higher order and habilitated in Heidelberg in 1998.

At the age of 33 Beneke became head of the Chair of Theoretical Physics (Department E) at the RWTH Aachen University in 1999. In 2008 Martin Beneke was awarded the Leibniz Prize in the amount of 2.5 Million Euro. The research done by Beneke considerably contributes to the verification of theoretical concepts of elementary particle physics, to the indication of variations and to the identification of new structures.

Awards
 Thawani Prize 1989
 Otto Hahn Medal 1994
 Gottfried Wilhelm Leibniz Prize 2008

External links
 Lehrstuhl von Martin Beneke, Technische Universität München
 Martin Beneke, RWTH Aachen
 Gottfried Wilhelm Leibniz Prize 2008 (in German)
 RWTH Physicist Martin Beneke Receives Highly-renowned International Prize

1966 births
Living people
21st-century German physicists
RWTH Aachen University alumni
Academic staff of the Technical University of Munich
Heidelberg University alumni
Alumni of the University of Cambridge
Gottfried Wilhelm Leibniz Prize winners